Rhazine is an alkaloid isolated from Alstonia boonei, a tree of West Africa.

References

Indole alkaloids
Heterocyclic compounds with 5 rings